The Norwood procedure is the first of three surgeries intended to create a new functional systemic circuit in patients with hypoplastic left heart syndrome and other complex heart defects with single ventricle physiology. The first successful Norwood procedure involving the use of a cardiopulmonary bypass was reported by Dr. William Imon Norwood, Jr. and colleagues in 1981.

Variations of Norwood procedure, or Stage 1 palliation, have been proposed and adopted over the last 30 years, however the key steps have remain unchanged. In order to utilize the right ventricle as the main blood pumping mechanism into the systemic and pulmonary circulation, a connection between left and right atria is established via atrial septectomy. Next a connection between the right ventricle and aorta is forged with the reconstruction of the narrowed outflow track using a tissue graft from the distal main pulmonary artery.  Lastly, an aortopulmonary shunt is created connecting the aorta to the main pulmonary artery to provide pulmonary blood flow.

The second surgery also known as the Glenn procedure, focuses on separating the systemic and pulmonary circulation once pulmonary vascular resistance drops. This is accomplished by removing the aortopulmonary conduit followed by the creation of a bidirectional SVC-pulmonary shunt.

The third surgery (Stage 3) is the Fontan procedure, in which the inferior vena cava (IVC, the large vein carrying blood back to the heart from the lower part of the body) is connected to the branch pulmonary arteries. After this surgery is completed, all the venous blood returning from the body flows directly to the lungs.

Indications

Norwood procedure is most commonly performed to treat hypoplastic left heart syndrome, however variations of this procedure are also used for palliation of mitral and tricuspid atresia, and subsets of transposition of great arteries (TGA).

In these conditions, the most urgent problem is that the heart is unable to pump blood to the systemic circulation (i.e. to the body).  The goal of these three surgeries is to ultimately connect the single ventricle to the systemic circulation.  To accomplish this, blood flow to the lungs is disrupted, and therefore an alternative path must be created to provide blood flow to the lungs.

Process
Entry to the body cavity for the Norwood procedure is gained by a vertical incision above the sternum. Separation of the sternum is necessary.  This surgery is complex and may vary slightly depending on the diagnosis and overall condition of the heart. The surgery on the heart can be divided into two main steps.

Providing systemic circulation
The main pulmonary artery is separated from the left and right portions of the pulmonary artery and joined with the upper portion of the aorta.  Widening of the pulmonary artery is often necessary, and may be accomplished by using the patient's existing biological tissue, or appropriate animal tissue.  This allows the blood, a mixture of oxygenated and deoxygenated, to be pumped to the body via the morphologic right ventricle, through the pulmonary valve. At this point in the surgery, the right ventricle is directly connected to systemic circulation through the Neoaorta or the reconstructed aortic outflow track. Second step of the procedure establishes blood flow to the lungs.

Providing pulmonary circulation
Variations to this step have been proposed over the years, however only two have been adapted in general practice over the last 20 years. In both cases a conduit is used to direct blood flow into the lungs, however anatomic anchoring varies. There are two different types of shunts used during the procedure: Modified Blalock Traussig or (MBTS) and right ventricle- to pulmonary artery shunt (RVPA or Sano shunt). MBTS shunt provides connection from the pulmonary artery to brachiocephalic artery or subclavian artery, while the RVPA conduit provides connection from right ventricle to pulmonary artery.
 Blalock-Taussig Shunt, a Gore-Tex conduit (a kind of plastic tubing) is used to connect the subclavian artery to the pulmonary artery.  In this case blood comes from the single ventricle, through the pulmonary valve, the reconstructed aorta, the subclavian artery, and the conduit, to the lungs.  There are variations on this procedure where the origin of the shunt is elsewhere in the systemic circulation (e.g. from the aorta itself) rather than the subclavian artery.
 With a Sano shunt, an incision is made in the wall of the single ventricle, and a Gore-Tex conduit is used to connect the ventricle to the pulmonary artery. Direct canalization to the right ventricle provides pulsatile blood flow compared to the Blalock-Taussig conduit.
The Single Ventricle Reconstruction conducted in 2005 compared the two conduits at one, three and five year intervals. Although RVPA shunts performed better at the one and three year end points, five year follow up demonstrated no difference between survival or improvement in freedom from transplantation.

After Norwood procedure infants enter the interstage which typically lasts up to 5 months. During this period the patients are medically optimized using diuretics and vasodilators.

Interstage Sequelae and Long Term Outcomes
Infants normally undergo the Norwood procedure within the first three to seven days postpartum. The decision for earlier intervention rests in the neonate's cardiopulmonary status. Interstage period, or the period after Norwood procedure and before stage II palliation remains associated with mortality rates ranging from 2%-20%. A few risk factors contributing to increased interstage mortality have been identified: gestational age less than 37 weeks at delivery, Hispanic ethnicity, and census block poverty level. Airway complications, as well as difficulties with feeding, and upper respiratory infections have also been associated with increased mortality. Despite results from SVR trial, Blalock-Taussig conduits remained significantly associated with interim death compared to RVPA bypass up to 1 year post palliation.

Immediate post surgical complications have been reported by multiple studies to involve paralysis of the vocal cords due to close proximity of the recurrent laryngeal nerve to the cardiac sack, cardiac arrhythmias as a result of potential cardiac tissue manipulation and damage, and protein-losing enteropathy.

With the increasing survival rates even for the most complicated congenital heart diseases such as HLHS, long term outcomes on neurodevelopemental have been closely analyzed after the SVR trial. Data from et al. Ohye demonstrated below average performance as scored using Psychomotor- Developmental Index (PDI) and Mental Developmental Index (MDI) of the Bayley Scales of Infant Development in infants 14 months and older. Additionally, Ages and Stages Questionnaire (ASQ) was used for the three year follow up. Consisting of five domains the ASQ evaluates Communication, Gross Motor, Fine Motor, Problem solving, and Personal/Social interactions. Again statistical analysis demonstrated below average performance for Norwood patients compared to reference population in all five of the aforementioned domains. Risk factors directly affecting PDI score were found to be lower birth weight, longer length of stay following Norwood procedure, and more complications between Norwood procedure and 1 year of age.

Prenatal detection of a HLHS defect is critical to successful palliation. As HLHS is incompatible with life postpartum, the only treatment is surgery. Despite surgical intervention, infants are at a constant risk of circulatory failure and death. In fact recent reviews suggest that only 66% of infants will live past 5 years of age. Furthermore, infants have a mortality risk of 1% per year following last stage palliation.

History 

First ever series of documented Norwood procedures were performed by Dr. William Imon Norwood between 1979 and 1981. Dr. Norwood was an American physician who completed his fellowship in cardiothoracic pediatric surgery at Boston Children's Medical Center (BCMC), Boston Massachusetts. During his time at BCMC he became interested in the most complex congenital heart defects, particularly HLHS. Under direct supervision of his program mentor Dr. Aldo Castanedo, he performed and later perfected what would become the three stage Norwood palliation. After successful publication of his work in 1981, Dr. Norwood joined the Project Hope stationed in Krakow, Poland. There, he continued to develop and refine his work: he was responsible for Poland's first ever Fontan procedure in a patient with single ventricle pathology.

References 

Cardiac surgery
Congenital heart defects
Pediatric surgical procedures